Jewellery is the debut studio album by English musician Micachu, co-produced by Matthew Herbert. It was released on 9 March 2009 on a joint venture between Rough Trade Records and Accidental Records. The album features Micachu's band The Shapes, which comprises Raisa Khan (keyboards and electronics) and Marc Pell (percussion and drums).

Reception

Upon its release, Jewellery received generally positive reviews from critics. It maintains a 75 score on Metacritic. Most reviews, both positive and negative, emphasized the originality and experimental, sometimes difficult nature of the music. Drowned in Sound praised the experimental sound of the album calling it "thrillingly improbable pop made by a grade-A maverick." The Guardian similarly praised the music for combining "hard experimentation with soft introspection, her scrappy, lo-fi production wrapped in warmth."

Some reviews were more mixed, but again focused on the experimental sound. PopMatters noted the challenging nature of the music: "The whole experience seems crowded with random experimentation for its own sake," adding, "With a little patience, however, Jewellery soon orders itself." Under the Radar was less sympathetic, asserting, "The record is admirable for its crashing ambitions, but it unfortunately devolves into a tuneless, nearly unlistenable mire of avant-noise fragments."

Track listing

Notes
 Early review versions of the album sent by Accidental Records before the Rough Trade deal included an additional song called "Worst Bastard" (likely removed for being the only song containing obscenities) and listed "Hardcore" as a normal track rather than a bonus track.

Charts

References

External links
Jewellery at Rough Trade Records

2009 debut albums
Micachu albums
Rough Trade Records albums
Avant-pop albums
Art pop albums
Experimental pop albums
Electronic albums by English artists